George John Wolf House, also known as the Wolf-Knapp House, is a historic home located at Hammond, Lake County, Indiana.  The house was built in 1929–1930, and is a two-story, roughly "L"-shaped, Tudor Revival style limestone dwelling with a slate roof.  It features a two-story round tower with a conical roof enclosing a winding staircase.

It was listed in the National Register of Historic Places in 2007.  It is located in the Roselawn-Forest Heights Historic District.

References

Hammond, Indiana
Houses on the National Register of Historic Places in Indiana
Tudor Revival architecture in Indiana
Houses completed in 1930
Buildings and structures in Lake County, Indiana
National Register of Historic Places in Lake County, Indiana
Historic district contributing properties in Indiana